Honkytonk University is the ninth studio album by American country music artist Toby Keith, released on May 17, 2005 by DreamWorks Records. The album has been certified 1× Platinum for sales of in excess of 1 million units. "Honkytonk U" was the first single to be released from the album, breaking the country top 10. "As Good as I Once Was" was the album's biggest hit, topping the Billboard Hot Country Songs charts for six weeks. It was Keith's last studio album for DreamWorks before the label's bankruptcy in 2006.

Track listing
All songs written by Toby Keith and Scotty Emerick except where noted.
 "Honkytonk U" (Toby Keith) - 3:35
 "As Good as I Once Was" - 3:49
 "She Ain't Hooked on Me No More" - 3:36
duet with Merle Haggard
 "Big Blue Note" - 2:58
 "Just the Guy to Do It" - 2:59
 "She Left Me" (Keith) - 3:21
 "Knock Yourself Out" (Keith, Emerick, Dean Dillon) - 3:05
 "You Ain't Leavin' (Thank God Are Ya)" (Keith, Emerick, Dillon) - 3:13
 "I Got It Bad" (Keith, Chuck Cannon) - 3:51
 "Your Smile" - 3:24
 "Where You Gonna Go" - 4:04
 "You Caught Me at a Bad Time" - 3:27

Personnel
Eddie Bayers – drums on "Honkytonk U"
Mark Casstevens – acoustic guitar on "Honkytonk U"
Dan Dugmore – steel guitar on "Honkytonk U"
Scotty Emerick – acoustic guitar
Shannon Forrest – drums on all tracks except "Honkytonk U"
Paul Franklin – steel guitar, dobro
Merle Haggard – duet vocals on "She Ain't Hooked on Me No More"
Tony Harrell – piano, keyboards on "Honkytonk U"
Wes Hightower – background vocals
Johnny Hiland – electric guitar on "She Left Me"
David Hungate – bass guitar on "Honkytonk U"
Clayton Ivey – piano, keyboards, Hammond B-3 organ
Toby Keith – lead vocals
Julian King – background vocals
B. James Lowry – acoustic guitar on "Honkytonk U"
Brent Mason – electric guitar
Gordon Mote – piano, keyboards on "Honkytonk U"
Steve Nathan – piano, keyboards, Hammond B-3 organ
Jerry McPherson – electric guitar
Mickey Raphael – harmonica
Brent Rowan – electric guitar on "Honkytonk U"
John Wesley Ryles – background vocals
Biff Watson – acoustic guitar
Glenn Worf – bass guitar on all tracks except "Honkytonk U"

Charts

Weekly charts

Year-end charts

References

External links
 

2005 albums
Toby Keith albums
DreamWorks Records albums
Albums produced by James Stroud
Albums produced by Toby Keith